Just Got Paid may refer to:

 "Just Got Paid" (Johnny Kemp song), 1988
 "Just Got Paid" (Sigala song), 2018
 "Just Got Paid", a song written by Billy Gibbons and Bill Ham which was recorded by ZZ Top for their 1972 album Rio Grande Mud
 The cover of "Just Got Paid", performed by Rapeman on the album Two Nuns and a Pack Mule
 The cover of "Just Got Paid", performed by Mastodon on the compilation album Covered, A Revolution in Sound
 The cover of "Just Got Paid", performed by UFO on the album The Salentino Cuts
 The cover of "Just Got Paid", performed by Joe Bonamassa on the album Tour de Force: Live in London – Royal Albert Hall

See also
 Just Got Paid, Let's Get Laid, a 2009 EP by the Millionaires